Dynamo Stadium is a multi-purpose stadium in Bryansk, Russia.  It was built in 1924, refitted in 1960 and 2004 years. Stadium is currently used mostly for football matches and is the home ground of FC Dynamo Bryansk.  The stadium holds up to 10,100 people.

See also
FC Dynamo Bryansk

External links 
 fkdb.ru — stadium at official site FC Dynamo Bryansk

References

Football venues in Russia
Sport in Bryansk
Dynamo sports society
Multi-purpose stadiums in Russia
Buildings and structures in Bryansk Oblast
Objects of cultural heritage of Russia of regional significance
Cultural heritage monuments in Bryansk Oblast